Jill Jones is a former American curler.

Teams

Women's

Mixed

References

External links

Living people
American female curlers
American curling champions
Place of birth missing (living people)
Year of birth missing (living people)
21st-century American women